Deh Bakri (also Romanized as Deh Bakrī) is a village in Deh Bakri Rural District, in the Central District of Bam County, Kerman Province, Iran. At the 2006 census, its population was 5,008, in 1,262 families.

References 

Populated places in Bam County